Kantishna may refer to the following locations in Alaska:

 Kantishna, Alaska, an unincorporated community in Alaska
 Kantishna Airport, an airport near Kantishna
 Kantishna River, a river in Denali National Park